Andrew McMillan (born 2 April 1985) is a New Zealand swimmer. He competed 4 x 200 metre freestyle and 4 × 100 metre medley relay events at the 2012 Summer Olympics.

References

1985 births
Olympic swimmers of New Zealand
Swimmers at the 2012 Summer Olympics
Living people
New Zealand male freestyle swimmers